The men's high jump at the 2012 African Championships in Athletics was held at the Stade Charles de Gaulle on 1 July.

Medalists

Records

Schedule

Results

Final

References

Results

High jump Men
High jump at the African Championships in Athletics